Kurepa is a Serbian surname. The surname has its origin in one of the oldest Drobnjak clan brotherhoods. At least 5 people with the surname were killed in the Jasenovac concentration camp. It may refer to:

Đuro Kurepa (1907–1993), Yugoslav mathematician.
Svetozar Kurepa (1929-2010), Yugoslav mathematician.
Milan Kurepa (1933–2000), Serbian atomic physicist.

See also
Kurepa tree, a mathematical object from set theory

References

Serbian surnames